The term Habsburg–Ottoman War or Ottoman–Habsburg War may refer to:

 Habsburg–Ottoman War (1593–1606)
 Habsburg–Ottoman War (1663–1664)
 Habsburg–Ottoman War (1683–1699)
 Habsburg–Ottoman War (1716–1718)
 Habsburg–Ottoman War (1737–1739)
 Habsburg–Ottoman War (1788–1791)

See also
 Ottoman–Habsburg wars in Hungary (1526–1568)
 Austro-Turkish War (disambiguation)
 Great War (disambiguation)